The sixth election to Pembrokeshire County Council was held in March 1904.  It was preceded by the 1901 election and followed by the 1907 election.

Overview of the result
Only a small number of seats were contested and, as a result, 29 members were returned unopposed.

Boundary changes
There were no boundary changes at this election.

Results

Ambleston

Amroth

Begelly

Burton

Camrose

Carew

Castlemartin

Clydey

Eglwyswrw

Fishguard
Yorke stood as an Independent although elected as a Conservative in 1901.

Haverfordwest, Prendergast and Uzmaston

Haverfordwest St Martin's and St Mary's

Haverfordwest, St Thomas and Furzy Park

Haverfordwest St Martin's Hamlets

Henry's Mote

Kilgerran

Lampeter Velfrey

Llanfyrnach

Llangwm
The sitting Liberal Unionist did not seek re-election

Llanstadwell

Llanwnda

Llawhaden

Maenclochog

Manorbier

Mathry

Milford
Dr Griffith had stood as a Liberal in 1892 and a Liberal Unionist in 1895.

Monkton

Narberth North

Nevern

Newport

Pembroke Ward 30

Pembroke Ward 31

Pembroke Dock Ward 32

Pembroke Dock Ward 33

Pembroke Dock Ward 34

Pembroke Dock Ward 35

Pembroke Dock Ward 36

St David's

St Dogmaels

St Ishmaels

St Issels

Slebech and Martletwy

Steynton

Tenby Ward 44

Tenby Ward 45

Walwyn's Castle

Whitchurch

Wiston

Election of aldermen
Aldermen were elected at the first meeting of the new council.

References

1904
1904 Welsh local elections